Maurice Crow (20 May 1925 – 17 November 2011) was a New Zealand weightlifter, who represented his country at the 1948 Olympic Games in London in the bantamweight (under 56 kg) division. He finished eighth, out of a field of 19 competitors.

He was also a member of the Clifton Rowing Club in Waitara, winning three national titles as a coxswain in the 1930s.

References

External links
 Photograph of Crow in 1938 as part of the Clifton Rowing Club coxed pair
 Photograph of Crow in 1948 in New Zealand Olympic team uniform

1925 births
2011 deaths
New Zealand male weightlifters
Olympic weightlifters of New Zealand
Weightlifters at the 1948 Summer Olympics
New Zealand male rowers
Coxswains (rowing)
20th-century New Zealand people
21st-century New Zealand people